Arthur Shelley was a footballer who made one appearance as a defender for Burslem Port Vale in October 1905.

Career
Shelley played for Chesterton, before joining Burslem Port Vale as an amateur in July 1905. His only appearance came at centre-half in a 1–0 defeat at Burton United on 21 October 1905. This was his only first team appearance in the 1905–06 and 1906–07 seasons, and he was released from his contract at the Athletic Ground, probably in 1907.

Career statistics
Source:

References

Year of birth missing
Year of death missing
English footballers
Association football defenders
Port Vale F.C. players
English Football League players